Sedgwick William Green (October 16, 1929 – October 14, 2002) was a Republican member of the United States House of Representatives from New York. He represented a district covering most or all of Manhattan's East Side. To date, he is the last Republican to have represented Manhattan in the U.S. House.

Life and career

Bill Green was born on October 16, 1929 in New York City, the son of Louis A. Green and Evelyn (née Schoenberg) Green. His father was a wealthy investor who was one of the main shareholders in Grand Union, and Bill Green grew up in Manhattan. He graduated from The Horace Mann School in 1946, Harvard University in 1950, and Harvard Law School in 1953. From 1953 to 1955, he served in the United States Army. After leaving the army, he was legal secretary for U.S. Court of Appeals (D.C.) Judge George T. Washington before leaving to practice law.
From 1961-64, Green was the chief counsel to the New York Joint Legislative Committee on Housing and Urban Development. He was a member of the New York State Assembly from 1965–68, sitting in the 175th, 176th and 177th New York State Legislatures. In 1968 he ran for Congress, but lost the Republican nomination to Whitney North Seymour Jr., who went on to be defeated by Democrat Ed Koch., Afterwards he was the New York City director of the United States Department of Housing and Urban Development.

Green was elected as a Republican to the 95th United States Congress, to fill the vacancy caused by the resignation of Ed Koch, and was re-elected to the 96th, 97th, 98th, 99th, 100th, 101st and 102nd United States Congresses, holding office from February 14, 1978, to January 3, 1993. A mostly liberal Republican, he was one of the few members of his party to have a long run in office from a city long dominated by Democrats.

However, the East Side-based district, long considered a bastion of moderate Republicans, had been trending Democratic at the national level for some time. Redistricting in 1992 made his district friendlier to Democrats, as it gained some heavily Democratic portions of Queens and Brooklyn. As a result, he narrowly lost his re-election bid that year to New York City Councilwoman Carolyn Maloney. Green sought the Republican nomination for Governor of New York in 1994, but was defeated by State Senator George Pataki.

, Green is the last Republican to represent any part of Manhattan in Congress. The Republicans have only made one substantive bid for the seat–renumbered as the 12th in 2013–since Green left office, and have never cracked the 40 percent barrier in the district.

Personal life and death
Green and his wife, the former Patricia Freiburg, had two children. He died from liver cancer at a hospital in Manhattan on October 14, 2002, two days before his 73rd birthday.

See also
 List of Jewish members of the United States Congress

References

External links

 

1929 births
2002 deaths
20th-century American Jews
20th-century American lawyers
20th-century American politicians
21st-century American Jews
Deaths from cancer in New York (state)
Deaths from liver cancer
Harvard College alumni
Harvard Law School alumni
Horace Mann School alumni
Jewish American military personnel
Jewish members of the United States House of Representatives
Lawyers from New York City
Republican Party members of the New York State Assembly
Politicians from Manhattan
Republican Party members of the United States House of Representatives from New York (state)
United States Army officers